The Quezon Memorial Circle is a national park located in Quezon City, Metro Manila, Philippines. The park is located inside a large traffic circle in the shape of an ellipse and bounded by the Elliptical Road and is the main park of Quezon City (which served as the official capital of the Philippines from 1948 to 1976).

This location will be the street alignment for the approved Manila Metro Rail Transit System Line 7 named Quezon Memorial MRT Station and the station will be underground.

"Circle", as locals call it, has been undergoing significant changes in order to lure in more tourists both local and foreign. Due to these beautification efforts of the local government the number of visitors is continuously increasing.

History
The site was originally intended as the grounds of the National Capitol to be built in Quezon City to house the Congress of the Philippines. The location was also part of a larger National Government Center located around Elliptical Road and the Quezon City Quadrangle (made up of the North, South, East, and West Triangles). The NGC was meant to house the three branches of the Philippine government (legislative, executive, and judicial). While the cornerstone for the structure was laid on November 15, 1940, only the foundations were in place when construction was interrupted by the beginning of the Second World War in the Philippines. After World War II in December 1945, President Sergio Osmeña issued Executive Order No. 79 stipulating the creation of a Quezon Memorial Committee to raise funds by public subscription to erect a memorial to his predecessor, President Manuel L. Quezon.

Former Quezon City Mayor Tomas Morato was instrumental to the selection of the site of the memorial park. Then President Elpidio Quirino proposed the relocation of the monument but this was opposed by Morato who resigned from his post as congressman representing Quezon province in 1949 due to disputes over the plan of then President Quirino.

A national contest for the Quezon Memorial Project was held 1951. Filipino architect Federico S. Ilustre's design won the contest. Aside from the monument itself, a complex of three buildings, including a presidential library, a museum, and a theater, were also planned to be erected.

In the 1970s the undeveloped grounds of the memorial circle was used for the mass celebrated by Pope Paul VI.

Shortly after the People Power Revolution in 1986, the Quezon City Parks Development Foundation (QCPDF) was established during the term of then Quezon City Mayor, Brigido Simon Jr. Under a tripartite agreement between the Quezon City government, National Historical Institute (NHI, now the National Historical Commission of the Philippines) and the National Parks Development Administration (NPDA), the NPDA was given jurisdiction over the  park except a one hectare area covering the Quezon Memorial Shrine which is under the NHI. The NPDA turned over the management of the park to the QCPDF and the city government gave the foundation authority to raise revenue for the maintenance of the park.

In the 1980s, the architecture firm of Francisco Mañosa made a masterplan for the park sometime in the 1980s.

On July 1, 2008, the QCPDF which has been managing the park from September 27, 1988, transferred management duties to the Quezon City government.

During the COVID-19 pandemic the park was the site of makeshift dormitories for health workers employed in nearby hospitals and a testing site.

Park lay-out

Quezon Memorial Shrine

The Quezon Memorial Shrine is an art deco-themed monument designed by Federico Ilustre and was built during the 1950s – serving as the centerpiece of the Quezon Memorial Circle. The  shrine representing Quezon's age when he died from tuberculosis stands on a thirty-six hectare elliptical lot. It houses an observation deck that can accommodate sixty people at the top through a spiral staircase which gives the visitors a panoramic view of the city.

At the top of the pylons are three mourning angels holding sampaguita (the national flower) wreaths sculpted by the Italian sculptor Francesco Monti. The regional identity of each female angels figure could be discerned in the traditional costume they were clothed with. The winged figures atop the three pylons represented Luzon, Visayas, and Mindanao. The three pylons would in turn circumscribe a drum-like two-story structure containing a gallery from which visitors could look down at Quezon's catafalque, modeled after Napoleon Bonaparte's in the Invalides. The gallery and the catafalque below are lit by an oculus, in turn reminiscent of Grant's Tomb.

Museums

The planned auxiliary structures (presidential library, museum, and theater) were never built. Two smaller museums, one containing the presidential memorabilia of Quezon, and the other containing items on the history of Quezon City, were installed within the Shrine itself. In the 1980s, missing, lost, or incomplete bas reliefs for the outside of the memorial were installed.

A house of Manuel L. Quezon family in Gilmore, New Manila was transferred within the Quezon Memorial Circle and was made a museum. A city museum, the Quezon City Experience (QCX) was also opened within park grounds in late 2015.

The Presidential Car Museum, housing the presidential cars of former Philippine presidents, was inaugurated on August 19, 2018.

Recreation spaces
Quezon City Circle also hosts the Circle of Fun, a small amusement park which has various rides such as the "Fun Drop" a drop tower ride and the "Sea Dragon", a pirate ship type of amusement ride. A separate attraction, the Pedal N Paddle offers go-kart rides, boat rides in a small pond, fish spa, a 4D theater and Skybike, where patrons ride modified bicycles attached on an elevated rail.

A children's playground and a rental bicycles are also available which can be used on a bicycle track within the park. Dining outlets and a flea market are also situated within park grounds.

Previously the park had a disco area near the Quezon Memorial Shrine but it has been closed down.

Public facilities for events such as the Seminar Hall, Century Hall, People’s Hall, and a stage, as well as covered courts were introduced by the city government which took over administration of the park in 2008. A dancing fountain was also renovated by the city government which is illuminated with colors at night.

Gardens, monuments, and markers

The elliptical park features smaller gardens and named green spaces within its grounds such as the Hardin ng Mga Bulaklak and the Tropical Garden. The urban farm inside the park is one of the several sites under the "Joy of Urban Farming" project of Vice Mayor Joy Belmonte which was launched in 2010. In 2011, the Cactus and Succulent Garden designed by Serapion Metilla was opened to the public.

Among the other areas of the park is the World Peace Bell. The bell installed not before 1994, was a donation of the World Peace Bell Association, a Japanese organization promoting awareness on the world peace movement. The Philippines was the first Southeast Asian nation to receive a bell from the association. It was designed by the Quezon City Planning Office.

The bell was turned over to then Quezon City Vice Mayor Charito Planas by World Peace Bell Association Executive Chairman Tomojiro Yoshida at the Tsunamachi Mitsui Club in Tokyo on July 1, 1994. The bell was inaugurated by then President Fidel V. Ramos on December 10, 1994, who formally presented the bell to then Quezon City Mayor Ismael Mathay.

A Peace Monument was also erected inside the grounds of the park by the Rotary Club. It marked Quezon City as a Rotary Peace City as part of the "Community Peace Cities/Towns" concept conceived by the Rotary Club of Wagga Wagga, Australia. Quezon City is the fifth Rotary Peace Community in the Philippines and 25th in the world. The peace monument was inaugurated on December 7, 1999. The monument was removed due to the construction of the Quezon Memorial Circle Station of MRT-7. 

The Philippine–Israel Friendship Park is hosted within the larger Quezon Memorial Circle beside the Quezon Heritage House. The park had its groundbreaking in December 2017 and was inaugurated in August 2018. It commemorate President Manuel L. Quezon's efforts to accept 1,000 Jewish refugees in the Philippines during the World War II era and the Philippines' support for the United Nations Partition Plan for Palestine and the establishment of the State of Israel.

Transportation
The Quezon Memorial Circle is totally engulfed by the Elliptical Road. A  pedestrian underpass was opened in October 2007 which connects the lot occupied by the Quezon City Hall and the park.

The park will also host an eponymous station of the Manila Metro Rail Transit System Line 7 (MRT-7), which is under construction.

Vendors and stalls
As of 2017, the Quezon Memorial Circle hosts five restaurants and 13 food stalls. There are also 19 kiosks, 39 plant stalls, as well as 21 stalls from Agri-Aqua Network International. 7 other establishments also has presence in the park including the TEC bike rental, Pedal n Paddle Inc., and Philippine Mango Seedling. Following a planned redevelopment of the park by Mayor Joy Belmonte some stall vendors and restaurants surrounding the park's children's playground vacated the park after their permit expired on June 30, 2019. Within the same year, Belmonte launched the Fresh Market, a weekly farmer-to-consumer program, that would allow farmers from nearby provinces to sell produce to residents within the park.

Visitors

In 2012, it was reported that an average of 8,000 people visit the Quezon Memorial Circle daily. The average figures during the weekends were reportedly higher during the weekends amounting to 12,000 people. In December 2011, more than a million visited the park.

See also
List of parks in Metro Manila
Manuel L. Quezon
Quezon City

References

External links

Quezon Memorial Circle at OpenStreetMap

Parks in Quezon City
National parks of the Philippines
National Shrines of the Philippines
Protected areas established in 1978
Landmarks in the Philippines
Quezon family
Tourist attractions in Quezon City